The Carroll County Courthouse, located in Courthouse Square in Mount Carroll, is the county courthouse of Carroll County, Illinois. The courthouse, which was designed by Chicago architects Olmstead and Nicholson, was built in 1858 and has been used continuously since. During the Civil War, the courthouse also served as a barracks for the county's troops prior to their commissioning. The Lorado Taft Monument, a memorial to the county's Civil War veterans, was added to the site in 1891. According to Ripley's Believe It or Not, the monument is the only Civil War memorial with an annex, which was added to fit names which had been left off the original memorial.

The courthouse was added to the National Register of Historic Places on November 26, 1973.

References

Courthouses on the National Register of Historic Places in Illinois
Italianate architecture in Illinois
Government buildings completed in 1858
Buildings and structures in Carroll County, Illinois
County courthouses in Illinois
National Register of Historic Places in Carroll County, Illinois